Point Tupper can refer to several things:

 Point Tupper, Nova Scotia, a community on Cape Breton Island.
 Point Tupper Generating Station, a power plant in the same community.